Ásgeir Bjarnþórsson (1 April 1899 – 16 December 1987) was an Icelandic painter.  His work was part of the painting event in the art competition at the 1948 Summer Olympics.

References

External links 

 Ásgeir Bjarnþórsson - Arkiv.is

1899 births
1987 deaths
20th-century Icelandic painters
20th-century Icelandic male artists
Olympic competitors in art competitions
Male painters